Elizabeth Dorrepaal Hills (born May 16, 1954), now known under her married name as Liz O'Leary, is an American rower. She competed in the women's quadruple sculls event at the 1976 Summer Olympics. The rower Elizabeth McCagg (married name Hills) is her sister-in-law.

References

External links
 

1954 births
Living people
American female rowers
Olympic rowers of the United States
Rowers at the 1976 Summer Olympics
Rowers from Boston
21st-century American women